He Cihong (born 6 June 1975) is a Chinese former swimmer who competed in the 1992 Summer Olympics and in the 1996 Summer Olympics.

At the 1994 FINA World Championships, she won the 100- and 200-meter backstroke events, setting the meet record in the women's 100 back at 1:00.16.

See also
 World record progression 100 metres backstroke
 World record progression 200 metres backstroke

References

1975 births
Living people
Chinese female backstroke swimmers
Olympic swimmers of China
Swimmers at the 1992 Summer Olympics
Swimmers at the 1996 Summer Olympics
World record setters in swimming
World Aquatics Championships medalists in swimming
Medalists at the FINA World Swimming Championships (25 m)
Asian Games medalists in swimming
Asian Games gold medalists for China
Swimmers at the 1994 Asian Games
Medalists at the 1994 Asian Games
20th-century Chinese women